The Ordinance of Labourers 1349 (23 Edw. 3) is often considered to be the start of English labour law.  Specifically, it fixed wages and imposed price controls; required all those under the age of 60 to work; prohibited the enticing away of another's servants; and other terms.

Background
The ordinance was issued in response to the 1348−1350 outbreak of the Black Death in England. During this outbreak, an estimated 30−40% of the population died. The decline in population left surviving workers in great demand in the agricultural economy of Britain.

Landowners had to face the choice of raising wages to compete for workers or letting their lands go unused. Wages for labourers rose and translated into inflation across the economy as goods became more expensive to produce. The wealthy elites suffered under the sudden economic shift. Difficulties in hiring labour created frustration. John Gower commented on post-plague labourers: "they are sluggish, they are scarce, and they are grasping. For the very little they do they demand the highest pay."  On the other hand, while some workers suffered from increasing prices, others benefited from the higher wages they could command during this period of labour shortage.

The law was issued by King Edward III of England on 18 June 1349.

The law
The ordinance required several things, including:

 Everyone under 60 must work.
 Employers must not hire excess workers.
 Employers may not pay and workers may not receive wages higher than pre-plague levels.
 Food must be priced reasonably with no excess profit.
 No one, under the pain of imprisonment, was to give any thing to able-bodied beggars 'under the colour of pity or alms'.

Aftermath and repeal
The ordinance has largely been seen as ineffective. Despite the English parliament's attempt to reinforce the ordinance with the Statute of Labourers of 1351, workers continued to command higher wages and the majority of England (those in the labouring class) enjoyed a century of relative prosperity before the ratio of labour to land restored the pre-plague levels of wages and prices. While the economic situation eventually reverted, the plague radically altered the social structure of English society.

It was later repealed by the Statute Law Revision Act 1863 and the Statute Law (Ireland) Revision Act 1872.

References

External links 
 Complete text of the Ordinance of Labourers, 1349, from Sources of British History
 Complete text of the Ordinance of Labourers, 1349, from Fordham University

1349 in England
1340s in law
Economy of medieval England
History of labour law
Medieval English law
Price controls
United Kingdom labour law
Edward III of England
Regulation in the United Kingdom